The 35th Hong Kong Film Awards presentation ceremony took place in Hong Kong Cultural Centre on 3 April 2016. The host of the awards ceremony was Sean Lau. The state-owned China Central Television did not air the program as it had previously for every year since 1991; this was because the film nominated for best picture in the awards, Ten Years, was seen to be critical of China's influence over Hong Kong. The Chinese government was reported to have ordered the state broadcaster not to broadcast the ceremony.

Awards
Winners are listed first, highlighted in boldface, and indicated with a double dagger.

Censorship 
The Hong Kong Film Awards announced 21 film awards in all, but there were only 20 according to reports in the mainland Chinese news media. Major mainland news websites, including Sina and Tencent, which covered the awards ceremony on 3 April 2 016 neglected to mention the winner of best picture, considered one of Asia's top film awards. In mainland Chinese cities where TVB, the main Hong Kong television channel, is aired, users on social media reported that the programme was blacked out and replaced with a cooking programme.

References

External links
 Official website of the Hong Kong Film Awards
 Hong Kong Film Awards 2013 University of Hong Kong Library 

2013
2016 film awards
2016 in Hong Kong
Hong